Allan William Buchanan (12 March 1916 – 27 January 1993) was an Australian rules footballer who played for the St Kilda Football Club in the Victorian Football League (VFL).

Notes

External links 

1916 births
1993 deaths
Australian rules footballers from Victoria (Australia)
St Kilda Football Club players
Australian Army personnel of World War II
Australian Army soldiers